Kyeema Doyle (born 24 November 1981, in Sydney) is an Australian rower who competed in the women's eight at the 2004 Summer Olympics.

References

External links

Australian female rowers
Olympic rowers of Australia
Rowers at the 2004 Summer Olympics
Rowers from Sydney
1981 births
Living people
Sportswomen from New South Wales
21st-century Australian women